Pedaliaceae, the pedalium family or sesame family, is a flowering plant family classified in the order  Lamiales.  
The family includes sesame (Sesamum indicum), the source of sesame seeds.

It comprises 13 genera and approximately 70 species. Eight genera are native to the African continent and one genus (Uncarina) is endemic to Madagascar. Four genera (Sesamum, Josephinia, Pedalium and Dicerocaryum) are mainly African natives but they also include regions to the east (including Madagascar, India, Sri Lanka, Malayan Islands and northern Australia). 

The family has a diverse range of seed and fruit dispersal throughout the various species. Including; animal dispersal via burrs, carried by feet (in Dicerocaryum, Harpagophytum and Josephinia) or caught in the fur of passing animals (Uncarina), winged fruits using the wind for dispersal (Holubia and Pterodiscus), or even winged seeds (Sesamothamnus and Sesamum) or via wind-ballists (Ceratotheca and Rogeria).
Wind-ballists are when the fruits open at the top but stay on the plant, then as the stems produce strong movements, the seeds are then gradually expelled.

Taxonomy 
The family is in the order Lamiales, as confirmed by the most recent classification of the APG IV system.

The historical Cronquist system placed the family in the Scrophulariales.  Cronquist included the family Martyniaceae in Pedaliaceae, but phylogenetic studies have shown that the two families are not closely related and they are maintained as separate by the APG. Both families are characterized by having mucilaginous hairs, which often give the stems and leaves a slimy or clammy feel, and often have fruits with hooks or horns.

Gallery of Pedaliaceae

References

 
Lamiales families